was a table tennis player from Japan. In 1954 and 1955 he won two gold medals in team events in the World Table Tennis Championships. He died from a heart attack in January 1956.

References

Japanese male table tennis players
1935 births
1956 deaths
Place of birth missing